George Davis may refer to:

Entertainment
George Davis (actor) (1889–1965), Dutch-born American actor
George Davis (art director) (1914–1998), American art director
George Davis (author) (1939), American novelist
George Davis (editor) (1906–1957), American fiction editor and minor novelist
George S. Davis (1906–1992), aka The Singing Miner, American country singer

Military
George Andrew Davis Jr. (1920–1952), United States Air Force major and Medal of Honor recipient
George B. Davis (1847–1914), Judge Advocate General of the United States Army
George E. Davis (Medal of Honor) (1839–1926), American Civil War officer and Medal of Honor recipient
George Fleming Davis (1911–1945), U.S. Navy commander, Medal of Honor recipient
George Whitefield Davis (1839–1918), American general and military Governor of Puerto Rico
George W. Davis VI (born 1938), U.S. Navy rear admiral

Politics
George Davis (American politician) (1820–1896), 4th Attorney General of the Confederate States
George Davis (Australian politician) (1833–1896), Victorian Legislative Council member, Minister of Defence
George Davis (New Zealand politician) (1873–1937), New Zealand trade unionist and local body politician
George Allen Davis (1857–1920), New York state senator
George Martley Davis (1860–1938), Australian politician
George R. Davis (New York politician) (1788–1867), Speaker of the New York State Assembly 1831 and 1843
George R. Davis (Illinois politician) (1840–1899), U.S. Representative from Illinois
George T. Davis (1810–1877), U.S. Representative from Massachusetts

Sports
George Davis (baseball) (1870–1940), American baseball player and manager
George Davis (footballer, born 1881) (1881–1969), England international footballer
George Davis (footballer, born 1868), English footballer 
Iron Davis (George Allen Davis, 1890–1961), American baseball pitcher
Mark Davis (fisherman) (George Mark Davis, born 1963), bass fisherman
George Davis IV (born 1987), American soccer player

Other
George Lawrence Davis (1830–1894), English Christian missionary
George E. Davis (1850–1907), British founding father of chemical engineering
George Francis Davis (1883–1947), New Zealand born industrialist in Australia
George Russell Davis (1861–1933), American jurist on the Arizona Territorial Supreme Court
George Davis (robber) (born 1941), British armed robber
George Harold Davis (born 1958), American spree killer
George Roscoe Davis, Washington, D.C. lawyer
George Davis House (Toronto), a designated house in Toronto

See also
George Davies (disambiguation)
George Davys (1780–1864), tutor to Queen Victoria and bishop
Georgie Davis (born 1969), artist name of Kees Rietveld, Dutch singer